The 2010–11 season was Nottingham Forest's third season in the Football League Championship, following promotion from League One in the 2007–08 season after spending three years in the third tier. Forest remained in this division after losing in the 2010 Football League play-offs. In addition to the Championship, Forest also entered the League Cup in the first round, where they were knocked out by Bradford City and the FA Cup in the third round, where they eventually were knocked out by West Ham United in the fourth round. In the league Forest once again made it the playoffs, losing to eventual winners Swansea City.

Summary

Forest announced their first pre-season friendly very early, the beginning of April the previous season, away at local neighbours Mansfield Town.

Early May saw Forest sign their first player of the new season, with the announcement that Radosław Majewski would be signing for Forest on a three-year deal, after a successful season-long loan, for £1 million.  A day later, a second friendly was announced, for the same night as the Mansfield game. Forest would send a team to Prenton Park to play Tranmere Rovers.

On 20 May 2010, Forest announced that they would play Peterborough United and Kidderminster Harriers in friendlies on the same date.

Changes to members of the Forest Academy were seen on 2 June. Shane Redmond, Jordan Fairclough, Jean Biansumba, Danny Elliott, Tim Hopkinson, Sean McCashin, Carl Sibson, Matthew Sykes, George Thomson, Max Wright and Tony Diagne were all released with none of them making first team appearances. However, 5 youth players were offered new contracts. Mark Byrne had spent a successful season on loan at Rushden and Diamonds to earn his contract, with Young Player of the Year Karlton Watson, Tom Mullen, Zannettos Mytides and Kieron Freeman also earning new contracts.

Forest announced their 5th pre-season friendly against League One Playoff runners-up, Swindon Town, to be played on 31 July 2010. It was announced on 16 June that Forest would play Champions League semifinalists Olympique Lyonnais at the City Ground, to be played 28 July. More foreign opposition was confirmed in the form of SC Olhanense to be played during Forest's pre-season stay in Portugal.

July started with the announcement that longtime player James Perch was to leave the Reds for newly promoted Newcastle United. Perch signed a 4-year deal for an undisclosed fee.

Two more players left the City Ground after Perch, but this time in loan switches. Mark Byrne made his way to Barnet and Joe Garner to Huddersfield Town both on six-month-long deals. Between these two deals, Forest won their first pre-season match 2–1 with goals coming from Robert Earnshaw and Matt Thornhill against Portuguese outfit S.C. Olhanense. Forest's first games on English soil saw them send out two teams to Mansfield and Tranmere. An arguably better side lost 2–0 to Tranmere, whilst a different eleven beat Mansfield 2–1. Three days later Forest again sent out two sides. A youthful Forest side saw them lose 3–0 to Kidderminster and a first team lost 1–0 to Peterborough, last season loanee George Boyd getting the goal for Peterborough.

Forest displayed an impressive performance against top European side Lyon, despite losing 3–1, and then went on to lose against Swindon in the final pre-season game, Kelvin Wilson on return from injury scoring an own goal. This completed Forest's programme of pre-season fixtures and was followed by Forest's first new arrival. Ryan Bertrand came to Forest on loan from Chelsea, until the turn of the year.

A day before Forest kicked off their season opener they let Julian Bennett go out on loan to fellow Championship side Crystal Palace for 6 months to help him get game time after being out with an injury for 18 months.

The fixtures were released on 17 June and saw Forest play relegated Burnley at Turf Moor. 3 days before the match Forest defender Luke Chambers put pen to paper on a new 2 deal to see him stay at the club until 2012, however The Reds went on to lose their first fixture 1–0. The following week Forest played their first home league match of the season against Leeds United. Dexter Blackstock headed in an early goal to give Forest the lead, but was followed by Leeds getting an equaliser before the break to see the match finish in a draw. Reading were Forest's next opponents. Forest played well for the whole game but managed to go down 1–0. However, after a freak error from the opposition keeper, Robert Earnshaw took full advantage to open his account for the season and to gain a point for his side. Forest's second home match saw them get a 3rd consecutive 1–1 draw against Norwich City. Dexter Blackstock fired Forest into the lead from the penalty spot, but Norwich managed to get an instant equaliser.

September began with Forest giving Millwall an early lead in a hardly fought match. However Blackstock struck again late on to earn a point, salvaging Forest's unbeaten home record stretching from a year earlier. The next game saw McGugan get his first start of the season, which proved to pay off. Forest dominated the game and unlucky to go in at the break losing. However, McGugan scored two brilliant goals to give his side their first away win of the season and was the beginning of an excellent run of form for the player. Forest met Hull City in front of the Sky Sports cameras and played out a bore-draw 0–0. Forest's next game had nothing boring about it though. McGugan scored two more for himself as well as Radoslaw Majewski scoring one to see Forest comfortable beat promotion hopefuls Swansea City with class. A late consolation for The Swans could do nothing to stop Forest claiming an impressive 3 points. Paul McKenna then got his first goal of the season, albeit with a lot of luck, from outside the area to help Forest earn another home point against Sheffield United.

Forest started October with two away games against Yorkshire opposition. The first was against Doncaster Rovers which ended in a tight 1–1 draw, Blackstock scoring first before Adam Lockwood struck back quickly. Forest then travelled to Barnsley and despite a fantastic strike from McGugan, the Reds played poorly and lost 3–1. However they turned this around with two impressive home displays. McGugan again scored a wonder goal to see off Middlesbrough 1–0 before scoring possibly his best goal of them all against Ipswich Town. He made a free kick from 35 yards right into the top corner after David McGoldrick's first ever City Ground goal to win 2–0. However Forest's poor away form saw them end the month on a low with a 2–1 defeat to Portsmouth, despite a Paul Anderson opener.

November was a successful month for Forest. It began with a good away point at Watford, courtesy of another McGugan belter. Then Forest played Coventry City at home. It began with a Chambers own goal, but this was put right a few later with a great strike from Majewski. Chris Cohen then bagged his first goal of the season to give Forest a 2–1 win. Forest fought out a 0–0 draw with the league leaders Queens Park Rangers and then played the league leaders again but this time it was Cardiff City away. McGugan yet again scored from outside the area to give Forest a first half lead and then Blackstock got a late goal to secure the win. However the afternoon ended a sour note with Blackstock getting a bad leg injury, ruling him out for the rest of the season. This paved the way for Nialle Rodney to make his first ever Football League appearance, albeit only for a few minutes. Forest made two mid-season loan signings on 25 November, the loan signing deadline. These were in the form of Sheffield Wednesday striker Marcus Tudgay with a view to a permanent deal  and Arsenal wonderkid Aaron Ramsey on loan till January. However these two new faces couldn't help Forest again ending the month badly due to their away form, losing 1–0 to local team Leicester City.

Due to the poor weather conditions Forest's games against Bristol City, Scunthorpe United and Middlesbrough were all postponed, meaning they only played two games throughout December. Forest overran Crystal Palace at home with a 3–0 win, with Luke Chambers, Marcus Tudgay and Garath McCleary all getting their first goals of the season. Forest signed American striker Robbie Findley on 23 December after he was released from Real Salt Lake, subject to a work permit. Then they played against their biggest rivals Derby County which saw Forest get their biggest crowd for 8 years. Luke Chambers got his second goal in as many matches with just two minutes on the clock to give Forest the lead. Despite a Derby setback, Marcus Tudgay bagged two goals against his home town club to send Forest into the break with a 3–1 lead. Robert Earnshaw got a goal against his former club followed a quick Derby goal to make the score 4–2. With a few minutes left Earnshaw made the score emphatic, making it 5–2 and extending Forest's unbeaten home record to 30 league games.

Forest started the New Year slow, going down 2–0 to Barnsley at home. However Forest were handed a lifeline when McGugan scored a penalty and then Nathan Tyson got an equaliser for the Reds in a match they deserved from. Forest got a good away victory against Ipswich Town 2 days later, winning 1–0 courtesy of an own goal. On 12 January Forest released young professionals Tom Mullen and Robbie Gibbons from the club. Forest's next home game was against Portsmouth and for the majority of the game they were losing 1–0. However, with 3 minutes left Portsmouth scored an own goal to equalise the game and then in stoppage time Tudgay grabbed a winner to give Forest all 3 points. Earnshaw then scored a late winner at Pride Park to Forest a second win of the season against rivals Derby. This was the first time Forest had done the double over Derby for 21 years. Forest then continued their winning run with 3 wins over Bristol City, Coventry City and Watford taking them into February in 2nd place.

The month continued well with a 1–1 draw away at league leaders Queens Park Rangers despite Forest's Majewski getting sent off. Forest then had their game in hand, away to lowly Scunthorpe United. However, Forest missed the chance to keep pressure on the top club by slumping to a disappointing 1–0 loss. Forest did not let this affect them thought. They beat promotion candidates Cardiff for the second time in the season with an impressive 2–1 home win to take them back up to second. Forests next home game was against bottom club Preston. The game looked to be finishing 1–1 before Chris Cohen scored what looked to be a winner deep into stoppage time. However even later in stoppage time Preston scored again to deny Forest a win. Away draws to Millwall and Middlesbrough saw them enter March in the playoffs.

Forest's 18-month home run finally ended at the hands of Hull City who beat The Reds 1–0. A further loss to Sheffield United away and a home 0–0 draw to Doncaster Rovers meant Forest had slipped far from the automatic places and were on the verge of slipping out the playoff places. This was confirmed when Forest conceded 11 goals in just 3 games all against promotion rivals, Swansea City, Leeds United and Reading, heading into April.

Forest got their first win in 10 matches against Burnley thanks to a brace from David McGoldrick. This boosted Forest's spirits and gave them belief they could still make the playoffs. This was again dealt a blow however when they lost 2–1 away to Norwich City. A week later Forest were back into the playoff places. They led three times before finally seeing off Leicester City 3–2. Forest then beat Bristol City, Scunthorpe United and Crystal Palace to secure themselves sixth place and a Playoff semifinal against Swansea City. Young goalkeeper Karl Darlow made his debut in the away game at Crystal Palace, playing 15 minutes for in the place of Lee Camp, who was brought off with a slight ankle injury.

Forest finished in sixth place in the league which meant they drew Swansea City in the playoffs semifinals, with Cardiff City playing Reading in the other semi. The first leg was played at the City Ground, where despite Swansea going down to ten men early on, it finished 0–0. The second leg saw Swansea get two goals in quick concession in the first half. Robert Earnshaw managed to get a goal back before hitting the post but in stoppage time, with Lee Camp out of his net due to a Forest corner, Swansea hit them on the break and got a third goal to finish the tie.

The draw for the first round of the League Cup was made on 16 June, with Forest playing the same team as last season, but this time it would be played at Bradford City's Coral Windows Stadium. Forest scored first in this fixture with the goal coming from young midfielder Matt Thornhill with a well placed finish. However, the home team managed to get an equaliser to take the game to extra time and then got the winner to progress to the next round, despite an encouraging performance from Forest. Also in this fixture, young players Nialle Rodney, Kieron Freeman and Robbie Gibbons all made it onto the bench for their first time in their careers, although they did not make an appearance.

Forest entered the competition in the third round due to their competing in the Football League Championship. The draw was made on 28 November 2010 at Wembley Stadium and pitted Forest against Preston North End from the same division at Deepdale. Forest had won in the league away the previous Monday and made sure this form continued into the FA Cup. Despite a first half goal from Preston, Paul Anderson and Luke Chambers made sure Forest were in the draw for the fourth round. The draw, held on 9 January, handed Forest an away trip to Premier League outfit West Ham United.

Squad stats

Appearances and goals
This is a list of the First Team players from the 2010–11 season. Playoff stats are included under Championship.
Last updated on 17 May 2011

|-
|}

Top scorers
Includes all competitive matches. The list is sorted by league goals when total goals are equal. Playoff stats are included under Championship.

Last updated on 17 May 2011

Disciplinary Record 
Includes all competitive matches. Players with 1 card or more included only. Playoff stats are included under Championship.

Last updated on 17 May 2011

Transfers

In

Out

Loans In

Loans Out

Academy Out

Club

Coaching Staff

Kit

|
|
|
|
|
|
|}

Other Information

Competitions

Championship

Table

Results Summary

Results by Round

Matches

Competitive

Championship
Last updated: 28 April 2011Source: Nottingham Forest F.C.

Championship play-offs

Last updated: 25 June 2011Source: Nottingham Forest F.C.

League Cup

Last updated: 25 June 2011Source: Nottingham Forest F.C.

FA Cup

Last updated: 25 June 2011Source: Nottingham Forest F.C.

Pre-season and Friendlies

Last updated: 25 June 2011Source: Nottingham Forest F.C.

References

Nottingham Forest F.C. seasons
Nottingham Forest